ticketscript was a European-based self-service event ticketing software. They provided software for event organizers to set up a ticketed event, promote and sell tickets online through their own websites, social media channels, affiliated partner sites and at the door. The company offered entry management tools and software; providing event organizers with live data, sales statistics and reporting tools directly from their computers, mobile devices and smartphones.

The company was established in 2006 Amsterdam, The Netherlands, by Frans Jonker and Ruben Meiland. They had offices in five European cities including London, Berlin, Barcelona and Antwerp and employ over 150 people across five countries.
The offices in Germany and Belgium were opened in 2009, the London office in 2010 and the Spanish one in 2011.

The company was acquired by Eventbrite in January 2017.

Products 
ticketscript provided software for ticket creation, ticket sales and event management. Their Flow app allowed people to manage guestlists and entrance.

Investment 
The company went through various rounds of investment funding, with the first round taking place in 2010. In 2014, London-based private equity firm, FF&P, invested £7m in the company, which enabled ticketscript to continue its international expansion and development of new products and features.

References 

Companies based in Amsterdam
Software companies established in 2006
Ticket sales companies
Entertainment companies established in 2006
Dutch companies established in 2006
Software companies disestablished in 2017
Entertainment companies disestablished in 2017
Dutch companies disestablished in 2017
2017 mergers and acquisitions